My Best Friend (Spanish: Mi mejor amigo) is an Argentinian film, written and directed by Martín Deus which was released on November 8, 2018. It stars Angelo Mutti Spinetta and Lautaro Rodríguez.

Plot
Lorenzo (Angelo Mutti Spinetta), a teenager who lives in Patagonia, receives Caíto (Lautaro Rodríguez), the son of some friends of the family who are going through a serious situation and cannot take care of him. Caíto is a troubled young man who has difficulty adapting. In spite of the differences they have a peculiar friendship, where each one learns a lot from the other. One day Caíto tells him the real reason why he had to leave his house. From then on, Lorenzo will have to take charge of a secret too heavy to carry.

Cast
 Angelo Mutti Spinetta - Lorenzo
 Lautaro Rodríguez - Caíto
 Guillermo Pfening - Andrés
 Mariana Anghileri - Camila
 Benito Mutti Spinetta - Lucas

Accolades

Participations
 2018 — Roze Filmdagen | Amsterdam LGBTQ Filmfestival (opening night)
 OUTshine Film Festival, Miami
 33 Lovers Film Festival, Torino
 Puerto Rico Queer Film Fest
 Cine Las Américas International Film Festival, Austin
 Cannes Écrans Juniors 2018 (Won first place)
 Frameline 42, San Francisco
 OutFilm,  31st Connecticut LGBT Film Festival
 San Sebastián Film Festival 2018: Best Film Nominated

References

External links
 

Argentine LGBT-related films
Argentine romantic drama films
Gay-related films
2018 LGBT-related films
LGBT-related drama films
2010s Argentine films